The men's 4x200 metre freestyle relay event at the 11th FINA World Swimming Championships (25m) took place 13 December 2012 at the Sinan Erdem Dome.

Records
Prior to this competition, the existing world and championship records were as follows.

No new records were set during this competition.

Results

Heats

16 teams participated in 2 heats.

Final

The final was held at 21:04.

References

External links
 2012 FINA World Swimming Championships (25 m): Men's 4 x 200 metre freestyle entry list, from OmegaTiming.com.

Freestyle relay 4x200 metre, Men's
World Short Course Swimming Championships